Ibrahim Mustapha (born 1 September 1996) is a Nigerian international footballer who plays as a striker for Plateau United and the Nigeria national team.

Career
Born in Maiduguri, he has played club football for El-Kanemi Warriors, Enyimba, Gombe United and Plateau United. He sent 3 months on loan at UAE side Dibba Al-Hisn. Following his return from his loan spell, he was linked with a transfer to Egypt. He moved to Al-Hilal Club in 2021, but returned to Plateau in 2022.

He made his international debut for Nigeria in 2018.

References

1996 births
Living people
Nigerian footballers
Nigerian expatriate footballers
Nigeria international footballers
El-Kanemi Warriors F.C. players
Enyimba F.C. players
Gombe United F.C. players
Plateau United F.C. players
Dibba Al-Hisn Sports Club players
UAE First Division League players
Expatriate footballers in the United Arab Emirates
Nigerian expatriate sportspeople in the United Arab Emirates
Association football forwards
Al-Hilal Club (Omdurman) players
Expatriate footballers in Sudan
Nigerian expatriate sportspeople in Sudan
People from Maiduguri
Nigeria A' international footballers
2018 African Nations Championship players